Eriogonum cedrorum is a rare species of wild buckwheat known by the common name The Cedars buckwheat. It is endemic to Sonoma County, California where it is known only from The Cedars, an unincorporated area outside of Guerneville near Cazadero.

Distribution
The Cedars is known for its botanical riches, including the endemic plant species Cedars fairy lantern and serpentine fleabane. The habitat is a serpentine canyon surrounded by non-serpentine terrain and many rare serpentine-endemic plants are isolated within. Much of the flora is also adapted to alkaline conditions, growing among seeps of mineral-rich waters that can have a pH up to 11. This species of buckwheat was first collected in 1947 and described to science as a new species in 2009. It can be found in three locations with an estimated 1500 to 2000 individuals in existence.

Description
Eriogonum cedrorum is a mat-forming perennial herb growing up to half a meter wide with hairy or woolly herbage. It has a woody taproot and caudex unit covered in rosettes of leaves each up to 1.5 centimeters long by 1 wide. The inflorescence arises on an erect stem up to 8 centimeters. The inflorescence itself is a cluster of yellow flowers that quickly turn dark red. The stamens are tipped with yellow anthers.

References

External links

Jepson Manual Treatment - Eriogonum cedrorum
California Native Plant Society Rare Plant Profile: Eriogonum cedrorum

cedrorum
Endemic flora of California
Endemic flora of the San Francisco Bay Area
Natural history of Sonoma County, California
Plants described in 2009
Critically endangered flora of California